The Belle Vue EP is the first extended play by British recording duo Hurts. It was released to iTunes on 9 July 2010.

Track listing

References

2011 EPs
Hurts albums
Sony Music EPs
RCA Records EPs